Peer Stromme also Per Olsen Strømme (September 15, 1856 – September 15, 1921) was an American pastor, teacher, journalist, and author.

Early life and education
Peer Olson Strømme was born in Winchester, Wisconsin to immigrant parents from Norway. Stromme graduated from Luther College and attended Concordia Seminary in St. Louis.

Career 
In 1879, he was ordained into the Lutheran ministry. He subsequently held a teaching post at St. Olaf College. Peer Stromme was editor of Norden, a Norwegian language paper in Chicago. Additionally he was the founding editor of the Norwegian language newspaper Dagbladet. He also translated books for the John Anderson Publishing Company in Chicago and the Lutheran Publishing House of Decorah, Iowa.

Stromme was the author of several books written in the Norwegian language which explored the Norwegian immigrant experience. His articles appeared in the Norwegian-American literary magazine, Symra. Stomme was influenced in his writing style by other Norwegian American writers who had provided a truthful renditions of the lives of immigrant settlers, in particular Hans Andersen Foss. Stomme employed many major themes common to immigrant fiction, including the process of settling and assimilating into a new culture. His settings are detailed and realistic, with his books frequently depicting individuals who are at odds with society. He is best remembered for his 1896 novel Hvorledes Halvor blev prest. It was translated and published into English as Halvor: A Story of Pioneer Youth by David T. Nelson (1891–1969), Professor of English at Luther College.

Selected works
Hvorledes Halvor blev prest (How Halvor became a pastor) (1894) 
Unge Helgeson (Young Helgeson) (1906)
Den vonde ivold (In the Clutches of the Devil) (1910)
Erindringer / av Peer Strømme (Reminiscences of Peer Strømme ) (1923)

References

Additional sources
Scandinavian Immigrant Literature (Christer Lennart Mossberg, Boise State University Boise, Idaho, 1981)
The Memoirs of Peer Stromme, (Originally published as Erindringer / av Peer Strømme translated by Dr. Neil T. Eckstein. Minneapolis, Minn: Augsburg Publishing House) 
Peer Stromme's Noraville Stories, (translated by Karl J. Schulz, Gerald Thorson, Neil T. Eckstein, Winchester Academy Ethnic Heritage Monographs. 1977) 
Halvor: A Story of Pioneer Youth, (translation by David T. Nelson. Decorah, IA: Luther College Press 1960)
The Western Home: A Literary History of Norwegian-America, (Chapter 13 titled "Knut Teigen and Peer Stromme, Natives of Wisconsin". by Orm Øverland. Northfield, MN: The Norwegian-American Historical Association, 1996)

External links
 National Library of Norway: The Promise of America
Luther College. Personal Papers of Faculty, Alumni and Other Individuals

American people of Norwegian descent
Novelists from Wisconsin
People from Winchester, Winnebago County, Wisconsin
19th-century American novelists
20th-century American novelists
American male novelists
1856 births
1921 deaths
American Lutherans
Luther College (Iowa) alumni
St. Olaf College alumni
19th-century American male writers
20th-century American male writers
Concordia Seminary alumni